Godlia is a station on the Østensjø Line (Line 3) on the Oslo Metro. It is the first station after the line diverges from the Furuset Line and is located between the stations of Hellerud and Skøyenåsen,  from Stortinget. The station was opened as a subway station 29 October 1967. Karl Stenersen was the station's architect. Rail service through Godlia is older, having opened as a tram line already in 1926.

Access to the station is from Godliaveien which passes below the line immediately south of the station. The neighborhood around the station is mainly residential, with several detached houses.

References

External links

Oslo Metro stations in Oslo
Railway stations opened in 1967
1967 establishments in Norway